Jamie Wilson may refer to:

 Jamie Wilson (American football) (born 1973), American football offensive tackle
 Jamie Wilson (snooker player), English snooker player
 Jamie Lee Wilson, Australian singer, songwriter and music producer
 Jamie Wilson (beauty queen), Miss Louisiana winner
 Jamie D. K. Wilson, British biologist